Granville Township, Ohio, may refer to:

Granville Township, Licking County, Ohio
Granville Township, Mercer County, Ohio

Ohio township disambiguation pages